Heidi is a 1952 Swiss family drama film directed by Luigi Comencini and starring Elsbeth Sigmund, Heinrich Gretler and Thomas Klameth. It is based on the 1880 novel Heidi by Johanna Spyri. It was followed by a 1955 sequel Heidi and Peter.

It was shot at the Rosenhof Studios in Zurich and on location took place in the Graubünden Canton as well as in Basel. The film's sets were designed by the art director Werner Schlichting.

Plot
Heidi lives with her grandfather, Alp-Öhi, in a cottage in the Swiss Alps and enjoys spending time in the mountains with her friend, the goatherd Peter.

The village parson visits the Alp-Öhi. He asks him to come to the village along with Heidi, to attend the installation of the new church bells. Around the installation of the bells, the village festival is held and traditionally it is the children who help hoist up the bells, and Heidi should not be absent. In addition, she could make friends with him and with the children of the village, because soon she should start going to school in the village anyway. The Alp-Öhi is not very happy because he is at odds with the villagers. They accuse him of being responsible for a fire which damaged five houses and the church tower. But the fact is that the Alp-Öhi did not cause the fire and even lost his only son – Heidi's father – fighting the fire. Shortly thereafter, Heidi's mother died from grief over the loss. Aunt Dete, the sister of Heidi's mother, initially cared for the child, but left her with the Alp-Öhi when she got a job in Frankfurt in Germany.

Dete is employed at the Sesemann house as a cook. Mr. Sesemann, a wealthy businessman and a widower, is seeking a companion for his daughter Klara who uses a wheelchair after an illness. Dete suggests Heidi, travels to the village and tricks Heidi into accompanying her back to Frankfurt.

Heidi quickly makes friends with Klara and helps her in every way she can. However, Heidi's natural and spirited manner continually exasperates prissy Miss Rottenmeyer, Klara's governess. All the other staff grow very fond of Heidi, especially Sebastian the butler.  All the while Heidi hopes to eventually be allowed to return home to her beloved mountains and grandfather. Eventually a minor miracle occurs: Klara, lovingly cared for by Heidi, begins to walk again. When Mr. Sesemann returns from a long trip, he is overjoyed when he sees his child making a few steps towards him. Out of gratitude for Heidi's accomplishing this miracle, he decrees that she shall stay indefinitely, but this secretly throws her into despair because of her homesickness.

Soon afterward the household is disturbed by what seem to be nightly appearances of a ghost. These are revealed by Mr. Sesemann and Doctor Classen, the family doctor and a good friend, to actually being Heidi sleep-walking around the house. Recognizing this as a symptom of deep emotional distress, sympathetic Dr. Classen advises Mr. Sesemann to let Heidi return home immediately, back to her grandfather and the mountains. And so it happens, and it is furthermore decided that Klara shall visit Heidi soon during the holidays.

Heidi's return finally resolves the conflict between Alp-Öhi and the villagers, and on Sunday Heidi and her grandfather join the villagers for church service.

Cast
 Elsbeth Sigmund as Heidi
 Heinrich Gretler as Alp-Öhi
 Thomas Klameth as  Geissenpeter
 Elsie Attenhofer as  Tante Dete
 Margrit Rainer as  Peters Mutter
 Fred Tanner as  Pfarrer
 Isa Günther as  Klara Sesemann
 Willy Birgel as Herr Sesemann
 Traute Carlsen as  Klaras Grossmutter
 Anita Mey as Frl. Rottenmeyer
 Theo Lingen as  Butler Sebastian
 Max Haufler as  Bäcker
 Armin Schweizer as  Dompförtner

Critical reception
It is still considered the best film version of the novel.

References

Bibliography
 Bergfelder, Tim & Bock, Hans-Michael. ''The Concise Cinegraph: Encyclopedia of German. Berghahn Books, 2009.

External links
 
 
 

1952 films
1950s German-language films
Swiss German-language films
Films directed by Luigi Comencini
Heidi films
1950s historical drama films
Swiss historical drama films
Swiss children's films
1952 drama films
Swiss black-and-white films